

Aniventure is a British content creation and intellectual property company  based in London and set up in 2013 to produce family-oriented feature animation.

Aniventure works with production partners to take feature film concepts from pitch development through to completion.  It has a first-look service deal with VFX and animation service studio Cinesite.

Film projects 
Under its former name Comic Animations, the company's first release was the award-winning animated viral Beans in December 2013, co-produced with Cinesite, which amassed over 15 million views on YouTube. They then signed a deal with 3QU Media in 2014 to produce four films for Vanguard Animation, cultivating in Charming, Gnome Alone, Trouble, and Fearless.

In February 2016 it was announced that Comic Animations was in development on an animated feature adaptation of the stage production Riverdance, in association with River Productions and Cinesite. 

The following year it was reported that they had entered into a partnership with the Harold Lloyd estate to adapt Harold Lloyd based animated content.

In 2019 Klaus, the traditionally animated Christmas adventure written and directed by Sergio Pablos, was released.  Produced by his company SPA Studios in partnership with Atresmedia Cine and Aniventure, the film was distributed by Netflix.  Klaus won seven awards at the 47th Annie Awards, including Best Animated Feature, and also Best Animated Film at the 73rd British Academy Film Awards.  It was the first animated film from Netflix to be nominated for an Academy Award. That year, Comic Animations changed its name to Aniventure. Riverdance: The Animated Adventure would be the first film to be released under the Aniventure label. 

In November 2019 Aniventure's association with Blazing Samurai, to be later renamed Paws of Fury: The Legend of Hank,  was announced (reported to be loosely inspired by the Mel Brooks film Blazing Saddles).  A collaboration between Aniventure and GFM Animation, the news came on the first day of the American Film Market in 2019 that the project was fully-funded and moving into production at Cinesite.

In October 2020, Aniventure revealed the voice cast of its upcoming animated film Hitpig, with Peter Dinklage and Lilly Singh in the leading roles. The film is based on Berkeley Breathed's picture book Pete and Pickles.

Credits

Produced under Comic Animations

 Beans (2013)
 Gnome Alone (2017)
 Charming (2018)
 Trouble (2019)
 Klaus (2019)
 Fearless (2020)

Produced under Aniventure

 Riverdance: The Animated Adventure (2021)
 Mila (2021)
 Paws of Fury: The Legend of Hank (2022)
 Cracké: Family Scramble (2023)
 Hitpig  (2023)
 Animal Farm (TBA)
 Princess Awesome (TBA)
 Untitled Harold Lloyd film (TBA)
 Super Roach (TBA)

References

External links 
 Aniventure
 Cinesite
 Riverdance (movie)

Mass media companies of the United Kingdom
British animation studios